"Shake Your Thang" is a 1988 single released by American R&B and hip-hop group Salt-N-Pepa. The single was released as the first single taken from their second studio album A Salt with a Deadly Pepa. It features the Washington, D.C.-based go-go musical band, E.U. The song samples "It's Your Thing" by The Isley Brothers and "Funky President" by James Brown.

The music video features Salt 'N Pepa being arrested for "dirty dancing". At the police station they are questioned by cops played by Hurby Luv Bug and Kid 'n Play. There are scenes of them dancing in an all white room with a crowd and back up dancers, additionally they dance outside on stairs and on the streets. At the end of the video they are released from the police station, this leads into the music video for their next single, "Get Up Everybody (Get Up)".

In an interview, Salt explained she considers herself a feminist "in a way", emphasizing the need for women to avoid complete emotional and financial dependence on men. Songs like "Tramp" and "Shake Your Thang" express these feminist themes of female autonomy.

Track listing
 7" single 
 Shake Your Thang – 3:59
 Spinderella's Not A Fella (But A Girl D.J.) – 4:27

 12" vinyl / CD single 
A1. "Shake Your Thang"  (Club Mix) – 5:16 
A2. "Shake Your Thang"  (Radio Version) – 3:59
A3. "Shake Your Thang"  (Instrumental) – 4:02
A4. "Shake Your Thang"  (Acappella) – 0:28
B1. "Spinderella's Not A Fella"  (But A Girl DJ) (Vocal) – 4:24
B2. "Spinderella's Not A Fella"  (But A Girl DJ) (Instrumental) – 4:17
B3. "Spinderella's Not A Fella"  (But A Girl DJ) (Acappella) – 0:36

Chart performance

References

1988 singles
1988 songs
Salt-N-Pepa songs
Experience Unlimited songs
Go-go songs
Songs written by Ronald Isley
Songs written by O'Kelly Isley Jr.
Songs written by Rudolph Isley
London Records singles